Clio Maria Bittoni (born 10 November 1934) is an Italian jurist and the wife of Giorgio Napolitano, former President of Italy.

Biography
Clio Maria Bittoni was born in Chiaravalle, Ancona in 1934. Her parents were Diva Campanella and Amleto Bittoni. She received a degree in law from the University of Naples in 1958. 

She met her future husband, Giorgio Napolitano, in Naples while attending the university. Following her graduation they married in 1959 and settled in Rome. They have two sons: Giovanni (born 1961) and Giulio (born 1969).

References

External links

20th-century Italian jurists
20th-century Italian women
21st-century Italian women
1934 births
Living people
People from Ancona
Spouses of Italian presidents
University of Naples Federico II alumni